Gene Kennedy may refer to:

 Gene Kennedy (politician) (1927–2021), American politician
 Gene Kennedy (footballer) (born 2003), English footballer